Kiss and Tell is a 2011 Nigerian romantic comedy film, produced by Emem Isong and directed by Desmond Elliot. It stars Monalisa Chinda, Joseph Benjamin, Desmond Elliot, Nse Ikpe Etim, Uche Jombo and Bhaira Mcwizu. Though the film was a commercial success, it was met with mixed to negative reception.

The film revolves around two Casanovas, friends and business partners; Iyke (Joseph Benjamin) and Bernard (Desmond Elliot), and a  divorce lawyer, Delphine (Monalisa Chinda), who is a divorcee herself and doesn't want to have anything to do with men again. Bernard strikes a bet with Iyke which involves Iyke having sex with Delphine in ten days or forfeit five percent of his shares to Bernard; if Iyke succeeded, he'd have five percent of Bernard's shares. However, Bernard tells Tena (Nse Ikpe Etim), Delphine's best friend about the bet in order to have an edge, thereby complicating things for Iyke.

Cast
Monalisa Chinda as Delphine
Joseph Benjamin as Iyke
Nse Ikpe Etim as Tena
Desmond Elliot as Bernard
Uche Jombo as Mimi
Bhaira Mcwizu as Eka
Bobby Michaels as David
Matthew H. Brown as Tunde
Temisan Etsede as Lawyer

Release
The film was initially intended to be released directly to video, but the producer changed plans after production. A trailer was released on 16 May 2011. The film premiered on 19 June 2011 at the Silverbird Galleria, Victoria Island, Lagos, followed by a general theatrical release on 18 July 2011. It premiered overseas on 22 October 2011 at the Greenwich Odeon Cinema, London.

Reception

Critical reception
The film was a box office success, but received mixed critical reviews. Nollywood Reinvented gave it a 23% rating, commended Nse Ikpe Etim's performance, but stated that the concept is not original. NollywoodForever.com gave a 74% rating, also highlighting Nse Ikpe Etim as the standout performance and concluded: "....although predictable, it was a nice feel good romantic well acted comedy, nothing great, but most definitely good". Kemi Filani commended performances from Joseph Benjamin and Nse Ikpe Etim, but also cited that the story is not original. Faith Ajayi gave 7 out of 10 stars and stated that the direction was great, but complained about the sound mixing.

Accolades
Kiss and Tell received six nominations at the 2012 Nollywood Movies Awards and Nse Ikpe Etim won the award for "Best Actress in a Supporting Role". It got two nominations at the 2013 Nigeria Entertainment Awards and Desmond Elliot won the award for the "Best Film Director. It also got three nominations at the 2012 Zulu African Film Academy Awards.

References

External links

2011 romantic comedy-drama films
2011 films
Films set in Lagos
Films shot in Lagos
Nigerian romantic comedy-drama films
English-language Nigerian films
2010s English-language films